Ohod Club is a Saudi Arabian professional football club based in Medina, which competes in the  First Division League, the second tier of Saudi football.

Ohod was named after Mount Uhud, hence the nickname "Al-Jabal". Ohod have won the Saudi First Division three times and have finished runners-up five times. They play their home games at the Prince Mohammed bin Abdul Aziz Stadium.

During the 1994 FIFA World Cup two players from Ohod were selected for the Saudi Arabia national team and Cameroon national team, respectively, Hamzah Idris and Thomas Libiih. Other famous players are Redha Tukar (1995–2001) and Mohammad Khouja (2003–2005).

Honours
Prince Faisal bin Fahd Cup for Division 1 and 2 Teams
Winners (1): 1994-95
Runners-up (4): 1992–93, 1998–99, 2001–02, 2003–04, 
Saudi First Division
Winners (3): 1980–81, 1983–84, 2003–04
Runners-up (5): 1978–79, 1986–87, 1990–91, 1992–93, 2016–17
Saudi Second Division
Runners-up (2): 2000–01, 2006–07

Current squad

As of 17 September 2019:

Out on loan

Former managers

 Mohieddine Sharshar (1975–78)
 Jamel Eddine Bouabsa (1978–79)
 Mansour Ramadan (1979–80)
 Said Salim (1980–81)
 Hameur Hizem (1981–83)
 Mamdouh Khafagi (1983–84)
 Boujemaa Benkhrif (1984–86)
 Mohieddine Sharshar (1986)
 Abdullah Foudah (1986–87)
 Abdullah Foudah (1990–91)
 Mahmoud Abou-Regaila (1991–93)
 Habib Majeri (1993)
 Mahmoud Abou-Regaila (1993–94)
 Abdulaziz Raheem (1994)
 Mohamed Seddik (1994)
 Luciano de Abreu (1994–96)
 Abdullah Darwish (2003–04)
 Djamel Belkacem (2008–09)
 Abdel-Wahab Khraf (June 2, 2009 – September 17, 2009)
 Mohammed Al Sahali (caretaker) (September 17, 2009 – October 6, 2009)
 Chokri Khatoui (October 6, 2009 – June 4, 2010)
 Petre Gigiu (June 22, 2010 – December 12, 2010)
 Florin (December 12, 2010 – February 20, 2011)
 Ayman Al-Seraj (February 20, 2011 – April 5, 2011)
 Essam Mohammed (caretaker) (April 5, 2011 – April 11, 2011)
 Hamadah Marzooq (April 11, 2011 – May 18, 2011)
 Aurel Țicleanu (June 14, 2011 – December 15, 2011)
 Mukram Abdallah (December 17, 2011 – January 14, 2012)
 Aboud El Khodary (January 14, 2012 – September 25, 2013)
 Abdullah Darwish (September 25, 2013 – December 15, 2013)
 Hadi Ben Mukhtar (December 29, 2013 – February 21, 2014)
 Abdulwahab Al-Harbi (February 24, 2014 – November 5, 2017)
 Nabil Neghiz (November 10, 2017 – February 18, 2018)
 Maher Kanzari (February 23, 2018 – April 12, 2018)
 Sadio Demba (April 12, 2018 – May 4, 2018)
 Francisco Arce (June 9, 2018 – November 23, 2018)
 Paulo Alves (November 27, 2018 – January 14, 2019)
 Ammar Souayah (January 19, 2019 – May 17, 2019)
 Nenad Sakić (July 23, 2019 – August 12, 2019)
 Tarek Jaraya (August 12, 2019 – September 6, 2019)
 Yousef Anbar (September 6, 2019 – August 18, 2020)
 Ayoub Ghulam (August 18, 2020 – September 20, 2020)
 Djamel Belkacem (September 21, 2020 – December 24, 2020)
 Khalil Al-Masri (December 26, 2020 – June 1, 2021)
 Chokri Khatoui (July 16, 2021 – November 9, 2021)
 Khalil Al-Masri (November 9, 2021 – September 12, 2022)
 Ndubuisi Egbo (caretaker) (September 12, 2022 – September 20, 2022)
 Ernest Gjoka (September 20, 2022 – )

References

External links
 Twitter page

Ohod Club
Ohod
Ohod
Ohod
Ohod